National Education Assessment System, NEAS, is an initiative of the Government of Pakistan to identify the gaps, challenges and to diagnose the strengths and weaknesses of the education system through measuring the learning achievement of the students for appropriate decision making for promoting the access, equity and quality in education system. National assessment is conducted across the country in five subjects each for Grade - 4 & 8 on sample basis after every four years. This report is meant to reflect the health of the education system for better understanding of the stakeholders. The report also aims at pointing out the pluses and minuses of the education system and the facts about students’ learning achievements along with recommendations on the findings for effective implementation. This practice is not peculiar to Pakistan, as the last decade has seen many ups and downs affecting national assessment at various subjects and grade – levels.

Briefly, initiative taken in primary and elementary education through the assessment system, named as National Education Assessment System (NEAS) in Pakistan is given for the audience in this report. NEAS has been institutionalized in Pakistan at national level with the cooperation of provincial and area Assessment Centers. Initially NEAS and its sister provincial and area education assessment organizations were established as five years development project with the financial assistance of the World Bank and Department for International Development (DfID) in year 2003. Realizing its significance in the education system, NEAS was made a regular feature of the education system before the closure of its project life. So far, NEAS has published four national level assessment reports on two grades each with four subjects. National Achievement Test (NAT) – 2014 is a step ahead of previous studies as the subject of English is introduced for the first time and performance of the students is being analyzed on the proficiency benchmark.

Recent Report

NEAS conducted National Achievement Test in 2014 and the findings of the study were disseminated in a conference on September 3, 2015. These findings provide some food for thought for those who wish to make positive changes in Pakistani educational system. NAT-2014 Report is a milestone in the history of NEAS, since this study was conducted by NEAS with the help of provincial PEACe's and Area Centres under guidance from Ministry of Federal Education and Professional Training Pakistan.

References

External links

NEAS official website 

Educational organisations based in Pakistan
Pakistan federal departments and agencies